Pat Lamberti (September 1, 1937 – December 19. 2007) was an American football linebacker. He played for the New York Titans and Denver Broncos in 1961.

References

1937 births
2007 deaths
American football linebackers
Richmond Spiders football players
New York Titans (AFL) players
Denver Broncos players
People from Woodbridge Township, New Jersey
Players of American football from New Jersey
Sportspeople from Middlesex County, New Jersey
Woodbridge High School (New Jersey) alumni